The Jägerhorn is a mountain of the Pennine Alps, located on the border between Switzerland and Italy. It lies just north of Monte Rosa, at a height of 3,970 metres above sea level, and overlooks the village of Macugnaga on its east side (in the Italian region of Piedmont), 2,600 metres below. On its west side it overlooks the Gorner Glacier (Swiss canton of Valais).

Near the summit (3,960 m) is located a small mountain hut, the Bivacco Città di Gallarate. It is owned by the Italian Alpine Club.

References

External links
 Jägerhorn on Hikr

Mountains of the Alps
Alpine three-thousanders
Mountains of Valais
Mountains of Piedmont
Italy–Switzerland border
International mountains of Europe
Mountains of Switzerland
Three-thousanders of Switzerland